Kamala (Nepali: कमला) is a municipality in Danusha District of Province  No. 2 of Nepal. It was formed in 2016 occupying current 9 sections (wards) from previous 9 VDCs. It occupies an area of 65.85 sq. km with a total population of 20,052.

References 

Populated places in Dhanusha District
Nepal municipalities established in 2017
Municipalities in Madhesh Province